99.5 Radyo Bomba (99.5 FM) is a radio station owned and operated by DRG Broadcasting Network. The station's studio and transmitter are located in Kidapawan.

References

Radio stations in Cotabato
Radio stations established in 2016